Stone Hill is an unincorporated community in eastern Dent County, Missouri.

The community is on a county road just east of Missouri Route 72 approximately ten miles east-southeast of Salemm. Stone Hill Branch flows past the south side of the community to its confluence with the Meramec River 2.5 miles to the west. Howes Mill is 2.5 miles to the east-northeast on Missouri Route 32.

History
A post office called Stone Hill was established in 1876, and remained in operation until 1954. The community takes its name from a nearby river bluff of the same name.

References

Unincorporated communities in Dent County, Missouri
Unincorporated communities in Missouri